Two ships of the Royal Navy have been named HMS Conway Castle after Conwy Castle in Wales.

  acquired c. 1804, was an Irish gun vessel hired to fight in the Napoleonic Wars.
 , launched in 1916, was a 274-ton naval trawler. She was commissioned by the Royal Navy in August 1939 and served as a minesweeper during World War II.

Royal Navy ship names